"Ti lascerò" is a 1989 song composed by  Franco Fasano, Fausto Leali, Franco Ciani, Fabrizio Berlincioni and Sergio Bardotti, arranged by  Fio Zanotti and performed by Anna Oxa and Fausto Leali. The song won the 39th edition of the Sanremo Music Festival, and the duo Oxa-Leali was subsequently chosen to represent Italy at the Eurovision Song Contest 1989.

Track listing

   7" single 
 "Ti lascerò"  (Franco Fasano, Fausto Leali, Franco Ciani, Fabrizio Berlincioni, Sergio Bardotti)
 "Ti Lascerò (Instrumental)" (Franco Fasano, Fausto Leali, Franco Ciani, Fabrizio Berlincioni, Sergio Bardotti)

Charts

References

1989 singles
Italian songs
1989 songs
Sanremo Music Festival songs
CBS Records singles
Songs written by Sergio Bardotti